Luis Jefferson Brown (born 1976) is a Canadian actor. He is best known for playing the role of Michael in Make Your Move. Starting in March 2015, he appeared in a series of television commercials for Intact Insurance, promoting the company's policy on opening claims for clients within thirty minutes of being notified (he portraying the claimant).

Early life
Brown was born in Fredericton, New Brunswick. At the age of seven, Brown's family moved to Newmarket, Ontario.

Filmography

Films

Episodic Television

References

External links

1976 births
Living people
Canadian male film actors
Canadian male television actors
People from Fredericton
People from Newmarket, Ontario
Male actors from New Brunswick
Mount Allison University alumni
21st-century Canadian male actors